Helodiaceae is a family of mosses belonging to the order Hypnales.

Genera:
 Echinophyllum T.J. O'Brien 	 
 Elodium (Sull.) Austin

References

Hypnales
Moss families